The link rat (Deomys ferrugineus) is a species of rodent in the family Muridae. It is also known by the common name Congo forest mouse. It is native to central Africa.

It is 12–14.5 cm long with a 15–21 cm long tail. It weighs 40-70 g. It has long legs and a pointed, narrow head, surmounted by enormous ears. It has a very long, bicoloured tail. The back and forehead are rich orange and brown and the underside is white. The rump hairs are stiff.

The link rat is nocturnal and crepuscular. It prefers seasonally flooded forest floors between Cameroon and the Victoria Nile. It has a widespread but scattered distribution and is seldom common. It feeds mainly on insects, crustaceans, slugs and some fallen fruits, notably palm-nut husks.

The link rat has traditionally been placed as a member of the subfamily Dendromurinae along with the African climbing mice, but has been demonstrated to be more closely related to the spiny mice on the basis of molecular data. A new subfamily (Deomyinae) has now been created, which contains this species, plus the spiny mouse (Acomys), the brush furred mice (Lophuromys spp.), and Rudd's mouse (Uranomys). This group is supported by several recent phylogenetic studies.

References

Further reading
Musser, G. G. and M. D. Carleton. 2005. Superfamily Muroidea. pp. 894–1531 in Mammal Species of the World a Taxonomic and Geographic Reference. D. E. Wilson and D. M. Reeder eds. Johns Hopkins University Press, Baltimore.
Nowak, Ronald M. 1999. Walker's Mammals of the World, 6th edition. Johns Hopkins University Press, 1936 pp. 

Mammals described in 1888
Deomyine rodents
Mammals of Cameroon
Mammals of Equatorial Guinea
Mammals of Gabon
Mammals of Rwanda
Mammals of the Central African Republic
Mammals of the Democratic Republic of the Congo
Mammals of the Republic of the Congo
Mammals of Uganda
Rodents of Africa
Taxa named by Oldfield Thomas